Paul Anthony Elliott Bew, Baron Bew (born 22 January 1950), is a British historian from Ireland and a life peer. He has worked at Queen's University Belfast since 1979, and is currently Professor of Irish Politics, a position he has held since 1991.

Academic career
Bew was born in Belfast. He attended Campbell College, Belfast before studying for his BA and PhD at Pembroke College, Cambridge. His first book, Land and the National Question in Ireland, 1858–82 was a revisionist study that challenged nationalist historiography by examining the clash between landowners and tenants as well as the conflict between large and small tenants. His third book, a short study of Charles Stewart Parnell, challenged some of the arguments of the award-winning biography of Parnell by F. S. L. Lyons, though Lyons, one of the "doyens" of modern Irish history, acknowledged the then young historian's arguments by stating that "Nothing Dr Bew writes is without interest." Bew's central thesis is that Parnell was a fundamentally conservative figure whose ultimate aim was to secure a continuing position of leadership for the Protestant gentry in a Home Rule Ireland.

In 2007, Oxford University Press published Bew's Ireland: The Politics of Enmity 1789–2006, which forms part of the Oxford History of Modern Europe series. The book received positive reviews.

Bew acted as a historical advisor to the Bloody Sunday Inquiry between 1998 and 2001.

Bew was also involved in the project by Boston College to record interviews by former participants in the Irish "Troubles", including former republican and loyalist paramilitaries. In 2014, Gerry Adams criticised Bew's handling of the Boston College project, as well as the journalist Ed Moloney and the former IRA volunteer Anthony McIntyre. Adams claimed Bew had deliberately chosen Moloney and McIntyre because they were unsympathetic to Adams. Bew expressed regret over the closure of the project, and stated further oral history projects of the Troubles were now "under a cloud".

Political involvement
Bew's political stance has changed over the years. In a 2004 interview for The Guardian, he stated that "While my language was more obviously leftwing in the 1970s than today, that sympathy has always been there". As a young man, Bew participated in the People's Democracy marches. Bew was briefly a member of a group called the British and Irish Communist Organisation, which advocated the Two Nations Theory of Northern Ireland. Bew was also a member of the Workers' Party, then known as Official Sinn Féin.

From 1991 to 1993, he served as President of The Irish Association for Cultural, Economic and Social Relations.

Later, Bew served as an adviser to David Trimble. Trimble and Bew are both signatories to the statement of principles of the Henry Jackson Society, which has been characterised as a neoconservative organisation.

Bew's contributions to the Good Friday Agreement process were acknowledged with an appointment to the House of Lords as a life peer in February 2007. He was created Baron Bew, of Donegore in the County of Antrim on 26 March 2007, and sits as a crossbencher.

Lord Bew was Chair of the Committee on Standards in Public Life, an advisory non-departmental public body of the United Kingdom Government, from September 2013 to August 2018. In October 2018, he was appointed as Chairman of the House of Lords Appointments Commission for a five-year term starting on 1 November 2018.

Personal life
Bew is married to Greta Jones, a history professor at the University of Ulster, with whom he has one son, John Bew, who is professor of history at the Department of War Studies, King's College London.

Bibliography

Monographs

 (with Henry Patterson)
 (with Henry Patterson)

 (with Henry Patterson and Ellen Hazelkorn)

 (with Gordon Gillespie)

Articles

See also
 List of Northern Ireland Members of the House of Lords

References

External links
Paul Bew's homepage at Queen's University Belfast

1950 births
Academics of Queen's University Belfast
Alumni of Pembroke College, Cambridge
British political scientists
Civil rights activists from Northern Ireland
Crossbench life peers
Fellows of Pembroke College, Cambridge
Former Marxists
Historians from Northern Ireland
Historians of the Land War
Life peers created by Elizabeth II
Living people
Male non-fiction writers from Northern Ireland
Member of the Committee on Standards in Public Life
People educated at Campbell College
People from Belfast
People's peers
Workers' Party (Ireland) politicians